Tony Alexander is a Canadian Paralympic swimmer. He represented Canada at the 1996 Summer Paralympics held in Atlanta, United States and he won the gold medal in the men's 50 metres freestyle S7 event. He also won the silver medal in the men's 100 metres freestyle S7 event.

References

External links 
 

Living people
Year of birth missing (living people)
Place of birth missing (living people)
Canadian male freestyle swimmers
Swimmers at the 1996 Summer Paralympics
Medalists at the 1996 Summer Paralympics
Paralympic gold medalists for Canada
Paralympic silver medalists for Canada
Paralympic medalists in swimming
Paralympic swimmers of Canada
S7-classified Paralympic swimmers